Sergei Nikolayevich Artsibashev, less Artsybashev; September 14, 1951, Kalja, North Urals District, Sverdlovsk Oblast, USSR —  July 12, 2015, Moscow, Russia) was a Russian theater director and actor. From 2002 until 2011 he was the artistic director at Moscow's Mayakovsky Theatre.

Artsibashev was recognized as People's Artist of the Russian Federation (2005) and made a chevalier of the Order of Honour (2009).

He died of cancer on July 12, 2015.

Partial filmography 

Etot negodyay Sidorov (1983)
Zhestokiy romans (1984) - Gulyaev
Zabytaya melodiya dlya fleyty (1987)
Vremya letat (1987)
Doloy kommertsiyu na lyubovnom fronte, ili Uslugi po vzaimnosti (1988)
Lestnitsa (1989)
Povest nepogashennoy luny (1990)
Mordashka (1990) - Kostya, Yulya's ex-husband
Letuchiy gollandets (1990) - Captain
The Inner Circle (1991) - Beria's Officer
Skazka na noch (1991) - Ochkasty
Nebesa obetovannye (1991)
Deti, begushchie ot grozy (1991) - (segment "Terrorist")
Pomnish zapakh sireni... (1992) - Grigoriy Ostapovich
22 iyunya, rovno v 4 chasa (1992) - Head of the kolkhoz (collective farm), Bragin's brother-in-law
Likhaya parochka (1993)
What a Mess! (1995) - Registry Office Worker
Ekhay (1995)
Nezrimyy puteshestvennik (1999)
Demobbed (2000) - Praporshchik Kazakov
Demobbed-002 (2000)
Demobbed-003 (2001)
Demobbed-004 (2001)
Demobbed: Snova v Boyu (2001)
Teoriya zapoya (2003) - Dedulik
12 (2007) - 10th Juror
The Fool (2014) - Tulskiy (final film role)

References

External links 
 

1951 births
2015 deaths
Soviet theatre directors
Theatre directors from Moscow
People from Severouralsk
Soviet male actors
Russian male actors
Recipients of the Order of Honour (Russia)
State Prize of the Russian Federation laureates
People's Artists of Russia
Burials at Vagankovo Cemetery
Deaths from cancer in Russia